Avon Valley (Bickton to Christchurch) is a  biological Site of Special Scientific Interest which stretches from Christchurch  in Dorset to Bickton, south of Fordingbridge Hampshire. It is a Nature Conservation Review site, a Ramsar site, a Special Area of Conservation and a Special Protection Area.

This valley has more diverse habitats and a wider range of fauna and flora than any other chalk valley in the country. There are internationally important numbers of breeding and wintering birds, such as Bewick’s swans and gadwalls. The flora include a number of nationally rare species and the river has a diverse fish fauna. Dragonflies include the rare scarce chaser.

References

 
Sites of Special Scientific Interest in Hampshire
Sites of Special Scientific Interest in Dorset
Nature Conservation Review sites
Ramsar sites in England
Special Protection Areas in England
Special Areas of Conservation in England